Meiocardia is a genus of bivalve.

Species
, WoRMS classifies the following six species as belonging to Meiocardia:

 Meiocardia cumingi 
 Meiocardia hawaiana 
 Meiocardia moltkiana 
 Meiocardia samarangiae 
 Meiocardia sanguineomaculata 
 Meiocardia vulgaris 

Species formerly classified in this genus include:
 Glossocardia agassizii

References

Further reading

 

Glossidae
Bivalve genera
Taxa named by Henry Adams (zoologist)
Taxa named by Arthur Adams (zoologist)